Bisglaziovia is a genus of flowering plants belonging to the family Melastomataceae.

Its native range is Southeastern Brazil.

Species:

Bisglaziovia behurioides

References

Melastomataceae
Melastomataceae genera
Taxa named by Alfred Cogniaux